Mollie Marcoux is an American athletics administrator who is currently serving as the commissioner of the LPGA. Marcoux formerly served as athletic director at Princeton University from 2014 to 2021. She previously served for nineteen years as an executive for Chelsea Piers Management in Connecticut, prior to beginning her career in athletic administration. Marcoux, a native of Ithaca, New York, attended college at Princeton University, where she played on the school's women's ice hockey and soccer teams. In four seasons, she scored 18 goals and recorded 11 assists as a forward for the soccer team, and as a forward in hockey she is ranked second in both goals and assists at the school with 120 and 96, respectively. Marcoux was named athletic director at Princeton University on April 15, 2014. She was appointed to be the ninth commissioner of the LPGA in May 2021.

References

External links
 
Princeton profile

Year of birth missing (living people)
Living people
Sportspeople from Ithaca, New York
Princeton Tigers athletic directors
American women's ice hockey forwards
Ice hockey players from New York (state)
Princeton Tigers women's ice hockey players
Women college athletic directors in the United States
American women's soccer players
Soccer players from New York (state)
Women's association football forwards
Princeton Tigers women's soccer players
LPGA Tour commissioners